Dagger Woods is a community in the Canadian province of Nova Scotia, located  in Antigonish County.

References

External links
 The tale of the Hidey-Hinder, the Dagger Woods Howler

Communities in Antigonish County, Nova Scotia